Fever Season may refer to:

 Fever Season, a 1987 science fiction anthology in the Merovingen Nights series
 Fever Season, a 1998 novel by Barbara Hambly in the Benjamin January mysteries series
 Fever Season (EP), a 2019 extended play by GFriend